JX Online 3 (剑侠情缘经典版) is a massively multiplayer online role-playing game (MMORPG) having 3.3 million daily active users in East Asia in April 2020. 
It is developed by Kingsoft and operated by its subsidiary Seasun Games.

It combines world-building with martial arts.

JX3 HD Remake is one of China's biggest games.

JX3 is the first Vulkan game to support ray tracing and it is one of the first 11 games to support nVIDIA's RTX Ray Tracing.

References

External links 
 《剑网3》官网——次世代国风MMORPG
 Games – Seasun Games

2016 video games
Active massively multiplayer online games
Massively multiplayer online role-playing games
Video games developed in China
Windows games
Windows-only games